Phyllonorycter ulmifoliella is a moth of the family Gracillariidae. It is found in all of Europe (except the Iberian Peninsula and the Balkan Peninsula), east to Russia and Japan.

The wingspan is 7–9 mm. The head is golden-brownish, face white. Antennae with apex white. Forewings golden brownish; a shining white median streak from base to 2/5, dark margined above; an ill defined white dorsal spot at 1/3; a somewhat angulated median fascia, three posterior costal and two dorsal triangular spots shining white, anteriorly dark margined; a black apical dot. Hindwings are rather dark grey. The larva is yellow-green; dorsal line greenish-grey; head pale brown.

There are two generations per year with adults on wing in May and again in August.

The larvae feed on Betula x alpestris, Betula grossa, Betula pendula and Betula pubescens. They mine the leaves of their host plant. They create a small lower surface tentiform mine. The lower epidermis is greenish-yellow and weakly folded. Pupation takes place within the mine in a cocoon. The frass is deposited in a corner of the mine.

References

ulmifoliella
Moths of Europe
Moths of Asia
Moths described in 1817